Lake Eacham may refer to:

 Lake Eacham (Queensland), a lake in the Tablelands Region, Australia
 Lake Eacham, Queensland, a locality surrounding the lake in the Tablelands Region, Australia